Mamprobi is a town in the Accra Metropolitan district, a district of the Greater Accra Region of Ghana.
It is located south of Lartebiokorshie, northeast of Old Dansoman and north of Chorkor.

References

Populated places in the Greater Accra Region